Himangini Singh Yadu is an Indian beauty pageant titleholder who was crowned Miss Supertalent of the World 2012, on 16 June 2012 in Seoul, South Korea.

Biography
Himangini was born in Indore, Madhya Pradesh.

She married her German boyfriend Marcel Rimmele in January 2018 and now lives in Erkrath, Germany.

Education
She completed her education from Shri Gujarati Samaj, Ajmera Mukesh Nemichandbhai English medium school, Indore, Madhya Pradesh, India.

I Am She 2010 
She was formerly a contestant and a Top 10 finalist in the first edition of I Am She held in 2010, India's national pageant for sending its winners to Miss Universe pageant.

See also
 Miss Supertalent 2013
 Diana Starkova
 Anna Lundh

References

External links
 Indore Public School

1988 births
Living people
Female models from Madhya Pradesh
Indian beauty pageant winners
People from Indore